KNZZ (1100 AM) is a radio station licensed to Grand Junction, Colorado and serves the Grand Junction area. The station is owned by MBC Grand Broadcasting, Inc.
 They are an affiliate of the BYU Cougars Sports Network.

History
KNZZ was first licensed on September 16, 1925 as a portable broadcasting station, with the sequentially assigned call letters of KFXJ, to Mountain States Radio Distributors, Inc. in Denver. However, Mountain States' 26-year-old president, Elden F. Horn, was electrocuted the next month while working on the installation of radio station KFBU at St. Matthew's cathedral in Laramie, Wyoming for the University of Wyoming. In 1926, as part of the settlement of Horn's estate, KFXJ's license and equipment were transferred to R. G. "Rex" Howell, a recent high school graduate from Denver and early employee of one of that city's first radio stations, KFEL.

Howell ran the station himself—including the advertising. He originally intended to base the station in Denver. However, under the regulations of the day, since the equipment had been licensed for portable use, KFXJ could not operate in any city with a fully licensed radio station. To solve the problem, Howell built his studios at a house in Edgewater, just two blocks from the Denver city limits. KFXJ first broadcast from Edgewater on May 1, 1926, and this has traditionally been recognized as the station's founding date.  For all intents and purposes, though, it was a Denver station, and quickly established itself as one of the city's leading stations. In September 1926, Howell had the station's status changed from "portable" to a permanent location of "Edgewater (near)".

KFXJ developed such a strong reputation that it was widely expected to garner the CBS Radio affiliation for Denver.  When it lost out to KLZ, Howell decided to move the station to Grand Junction, which didn't have any radio stations at the time.  KFXJ signed on from Grand Junction on January 31, 1931 from an Art Deco and block glass building on Hillcrest Manor.

Howell added a television station in 1954, KFXJ-TV.  However, searching for a more distinctive callsign, in 1956 he changed the call letters to KREX-AM-TV—after his first name.  He added KREX-FM in 1960.  He sold the stations to a Cincinnati group in 1966, but reclaimed control after several missed payments in 1969.  Howell died in 1978, and his estate broke up his empire in 1984, earning a handsome return on Howell's original investment of 58 years prior.  The television station still has the KREX-TV calls, and still operates out of the building Howell originally built for its former radio sister.

The AM station changed its calls to KVEE after the sale.  On November 15, 1989, the station changed its call sign to KJYE and on April 30, 1990 to the current KNZZ.

References

External links

FCC History Cards for KNZZ (covering KFXJ / KREX for 1927-1980)

NZZ
Radio stations established in 1925